Operación Triunfo is a Spanish reality television music competition to find new singing talent. The eleventh series, also known as Operación Triunfo 2020, began airing on La 1 on 12 January 2020, presented by Roberto Leal.

In addition to the Galas or weekly live shows on La 1, the side show El Chat airs on La 1 after each weekly Gala, hosted by Noemí Galera and Ricky Merino. The activities of the contestants at "The Academy" or La Academia are streamed live via YouTube.

Unlike the seasons previously aired by TVE, the series did not serve as the platform to select the Spanish entry at the Eurovision Song Contest 2020; singer Blas Cantó was internally selected by the broadcaster instead. Further changes were revealed during the presentation press conference on January 9, including different privileges to the favorite of the audience, who will no longer be automatically exempt from nomination, and the suppression of the usual limit to the number of contestants up for elimination.

Following the spread of COVID-19 in March 2020, the show was paused for two months, and then returned on May 20, with no live audience in the studio for the remaining episodes.

Headmaster, judges and presenter
Roberto Leal continues as host and Noemí Galera continues as the headmaster of the Academy. Ana Torroja, Joe Pérez-Orive, and Manuel Martos left the judging panel. On 12 December 2019, it was announced that the panel would consist of four permanent judges, without the presence of rotatory guest judges like in the previous two seasons. It was announced that the panel would consist of music radio director Javier Llano – who was previously a permanent judge on series 4, 5 and 6 –, musician and talent scout Javier Portugués, singer and songwriter Natalia Jiménez, and singer and actress Nina – who was previously the headmaster of the Academy on series 1, 2, 3 and 8 – are the judges.

Auditions
Open casting auditions began on 7 October 2019 in Barcelona and concluded on 6 November 2019 in Madrid. The minimum age to audition was 18.

A total of 10,601 candidates participated in the open auditions. After the open auditions, 86 candidates were called for the final auditions that took place from 25 November to 26 November 2019 in Barcelona. For the first time, all phases of the casting auditions were streamed live via YouTube up until the announcement of the last thirty candidates. Eighteen of these candidates advanced to the introduction live show or "Gala 0".

Contestants
18 contestants were presented on the introduction live show or Gala 0.

Galas
The Galas or live shows began on 12 January 2020. In the introduction live show or Gala 0, 18 candidates were presented to enter the "Academy." Each contestant performed a cover version of a popular song of their choice, and two of the candidates were eliminated. For the regular galas, the contestants are assigned a popular song to perform in a duet or solo. The audience votes for their favourite performer, and the contestant with the most votes receives a privilege in the competition, which varies every week. The jury panel comments on the performances and nominates a number of contestants for elimination. The Academy's staff meeting has the option to save one of the nominees. The safe contestants save one of the remaining nominees. Each week, at least two contestants end up being up for elimination.

Results summary
Colour key

Gala 0 (12 January 2020)

Gala 1 (19 January 2020)
 Group performance: Marisol medley
 Musical guests:
 Vanesa Martín ("Caída libre")
 Danny Ocean ("Swing")
 Favourite's privilege: Choice of duet partner for the next Gala.

Gala 2 (26 January 2020)
 Group performance: "I'll Be There for You"
Musical guests:
 Natalia Lacunza ("Olvídate de mí")
 Dvicio ("Dosis")
 Favourite's privilege: Performing solo at the next Gala.

Gala 3 (2 February 2020)
 Group performance: "Besos"
Musical guests:
 Beret ("Si por mí fuera")
 Ainhoa Arteta ("Piensa en mí")
 Favourite's privilege: Giving themself or another contestant immunity from nomination.

Gala 4 (9 February 2020)
 Group performance: "Díselo a la vida" (original song by Rafa)
 Musical guests: 
Blas Cantó ("Universo")
Miki Núñez ("Celébrate")
 Favourite's privilege: Carte blanche - choice of song, choreography and possibility to either perform solo or select duet partner for the next Gala.

Gala 5 (16 February 2020)
 Group performance: "Sabor de amor"
 Musical guests:
 Nil Moliner & Dani Fernández ("Soldadito de hierro")
 Gisela ("Mucho más allá")
 Favourite's privilege: Performing alongside one of the musical guests on the next Gala.
 Ruth Lorenzo stood in for Natalia Jiménez in the jury.

Gala 6 (23 February 2020) 
 Group performance: "Video Killed the Radio Star"
 Musical guests:
 Estrella Morente ("Volver" - with Nía)
 Miriam Rodríguez ("Desperté")
 Sinsinati ("Indios y vaqueros")
 Favorite's privilege: Giving themself or another contestant immunity from elimination.
 For the first time, the Academy staff decided to not to save any of the nominated contestants and kept the four nominees up for elimination.

Gala 7 (1 March 2020) 
 Group performance: "Waka Waka (Esto es África)"
 Musical guests:
 Edurne ("Demasiado tarde")
 Ariadna ("Al santo equivocado")
 Favorite's privilege: Choice of duet partner for the next Gala.
 For the first time, the Favourite of the audience (Anaju) was nominated by the jury for elimination.

Gala 8 (8 March 2020) 
 Group performance: "No Controles"
 Musical guests:
 Nathy Peluso ("Business Woman")
 Dora Postigo ("Ojos de serpiente")
 Favourite's privilege: Giving themself or another contestant immunity from nomination.
 Samantha was not medically cleared to participate in the group performance due to a knee injury.

Gala 9 (15 March 2020) 
 Group performance: "Hey Ya!"
 Musical guests:
 Alfred García ("Por si te hace falta")
 Rozalén ("Vivir")
 Marwan ("Las cosas que no pude responder")
 Favorite's privilege: A special dinner for two in the Academy later in the week with another contestant of their choosing.
 Due to the state of alarm declared in Spain as a result of the ongoing coronavirus pandemic, this Gala was held inside the Academy, with Roberto Leal hosting from his home, and there was no Chat show after the Gala. Musical guests also performed from their homes. Also a result of this, the week's elimination was delayed to Gala 10, with audience voting frozen until a week prior to its airdate once it was set. Miqui Puig and Nina served as jury from the elimination room.

Gala 10 (20 May 2020) 
The show was put on hiatus and the remaining contestants sent home as a precautionary measure over the ongoing coronavirus pandemic.

 Group performance: "Sonrisa"
 Musical guests:
 Stay Homas & Sr. Wilson ("Stay Homa")
 Anne Lukin ("Salté")
 Jesús Rendón ("Me sabe a sal")
 Starting this week, there will no longer be a favorite of the audience.

Gala 11 (27 May 2020) 
 Group performance: "Forever Young" (featuring the Academy staff)
 Musical guests:
 Pablo López ("Mariposa")
 Nick Maylo ("Historias robadas")
 Eli Rosex ("Miénteme lento")

Gala 12 (3 June 2020)
 Group performance: "Lay All Your Love on Me"
 The contestants that had already been declared finalists performed alongside musical guests.
 Musical guests:
 Gèrard ("Fugaces")
 Natalia Jiménez ("El lado izquierdo de la cama")
 Rozalén ("Este tren")

Gala Final (10 June 2020) 

 Group performances: 
Medley of Gala 0 songs
"Sal de mí" (all contestants)
"Díselo a la vida" (all contestants)
Musical guests:
Lola Índigo ("Mala cara" / "4 Besos")
La Oreja de Van Gogh ("Abrázame")
Famous Oberogo ("Hoy ya no")

Ratings

References

External links
Operación Triunfo at RTVE.es

Operación Triunfo
2020 Spanish television seasons
Television productions suspended due to the COVID-19 pandemic
La 1 (Spanish TV channel) original programming